Ruhl is a surname. Notable people with the surname include:

Dave Ruhl (1920–1988), Canadian professional wrestler
Donald J. Ruhl (1923–1945), American Marine; awarded Medal of Honor for action at Iwo Jima
Henry Ruhl (born 1945), American murderer; executed in Wyoming
J. B. Ruhl (contemporary), American legal academic specializing in environmental law
Sarah Ruhl (born 1974), American playwright
William Ruhl (1901 – 1956), American character actor 

Middle name:
Henry Ruhl Guss (1825-1907), Union Army brevet Major General

German-language surnames